The 2020 Women's T20 Challenge, branded as Jio Women's T20 Challenge, was the third season of the Women's T20 Challenge, a Twenty20 cricket tournament established by the Board of Control for Cricket in India (BCCI) in 2018. Like the previous edition, it was a three-team tournament consisting of a group stage of three matches, followed by a final.

The tournament was originally scheduled to commence in May 2020 in Sawai Mansingh Stadium, Jaipur coinciding with the IPL Playoffs. However, it was suspended along with the IPL due to the global coronavirus pandemic. The tournament was held from 4 to 9 November 2020 in Sharjah Cricket Stadium in the United Arab Emirates, still coinciding with the IPL Playoffs. IPL Trailblazers beat IPL Supernovas by 16 runs in the final and won their maiden title.

The season was viewed by 105 million unique viewers in India, a growth of 47% over the previous season. The 2020 season recorded 5.34 billion minutes in viewership in India, representing a 2.45 times increase over the 2019 edition.

Squads
On 11 October 2020, BCCI announced squads and schedule for Women's T20 Challenge.

Natthakan Chantam became the first Thai cricketer to be represented in this tournament. Overseas players Sophie Devine, Suzie Bates, Nat Sciver, Stafanie Taylor, Amelia Kerr, Lea Tahuhu and Hayley Matthews were not part of the 2020 edition, due to the fixture clash with the 2020–21 Women's Big Bash League season in Australia. Mansi Joshi was ruled out of Women's T20 Challenge due to testing positive for COVID-19. Meghna Singh was named as her replacement in Velocity squad.

Points table

 Advanced to final

Round-robin

Final

References

External links
 Series home at ESPN Cricinfo

Women's T20 Challenge
2019–20 Indian women's cricket
Women's Twenty20 cricket competitions
Women's T20 Challenge, 2020